Boneh-ye Cheragh (also Romanized as Boneh-ye Cherāgh; also known as Boneh-ye Ḩājjī Cherāgh and Cherāgh) is a village in Soltanabad Rural District, in the Central District of Ramhormoz County, Khuzestan Province, Iran. At the 2006 census, its population was 125, in 29 families.

References 

Populated places in Ramhormoz County